The Knight Marshal is a former office in the British Royal Household established by King Henry III in 1236. The position later became a Deputy to the Earl Marshal from the reign of King Henry VIII until the office was abolished in 1846.

The Knight Marshal and his men were responsible for maintaining order within the King's Court (Court of Marshalsea or Palace Court) which was abolished in 1849.

According to The Present State of the British Court, published in 1720,

The Knight Marshal was appointed by the Crown for life by letters patent under the great seal frequently in the form of grants in reversion. Board wages were fixed at £21 5s 10d in 1662. In 1685, a salary of £26 was provided. This was raised to £500 in 1790 but reduced to £271 in 1816.

The separate office of Knight Marischal exists in the Royal Household of Scotland, but has not been filled since 1863.

List of Knights Marshal
temp Richard III : William Brandon
temp Edward IV : Sir Ralph Assheton
temp Henry VII  : Sir John Digby
temp Henry VIII :  Sir William Pickering
1542 26 August – 1556 : Sir Ralph Hopton (died 1571) 
1555 : Sir Anthony Kingston (died 1556)
1556 May – 1558 : Sir Thomas Holcroft
1558 Mar – 1558 : Sir Thomas Hervey
1558 21 Dec – 1571 : Sir Ralph Hopton and Robert Hopton (jointly)
1571 - 1577: Robert Hopton (alone)
1578: Sir George Carey 
1597 May : Sir Thomas Gerard (created Baron Gerard, 1603)
1604 – 1618 :Sir Thomas Vavasour
1618 – 1626 : Sir Edward Zouche
1626 – 1642 : Sir Edmund Verney
c.1642 : Sir Edward Sydenham
?1651 : Sir Robert Throckmorton
1649 – 1660 : Interregnum
1660 11 July : Sir William Throckmorton
1667 22 April : Sir Edmund Wyndham
1681 3 March – ?1689 : Sir Edward Villiers
1689 4 July : Sir Edward Villiers (died 1711)
1700 11 July  – 1757 : Sir Philip Meadows
1757 5 December – 1792 : Sir Sydney Meadows
1792 15 November – 1795 : Hugh Boscawen
1795 10 November – 1824 : Sir James Lamb (formerly Burges), 1st Bt
1824 11 October – 1846 : Sir Charles Montolieu Lamb, 2nd Bt
1846 Post abolished

H.M.'s Marshalmen

A token number of Marshalmen continued to be appointed even after the demise of the Marshalsea Court; they became honorary appointments within the Royal Household and were in attendance on the Sovereign on ceremonial occasions. Six King's Marshalmen took part in the 1937 Coronation procession of King George VI; since when appointments to this office have ceased. The Marshalmen wore a distinctive uniform, consisting of a scarlet coat, blue trousers and a shako (a tall, cylindrical cap with a visor), and carried a baton engraved with the Royal Arms at one end, and at the other the coat of arms of the City of Westminster.

See also
 Dublin City Marshal, maintained the Dublin Marshalsea

Sources

References

External links
Photograph of Marshalmen on duty at the State Opening of Parliament in 1909 (National Portrait Gallery)

Positions within the British Royal Household